Nongstoin (IPA: ˈnɒŋˌstɔɪn) is the headquarters of West Khasi Hills district in the state of Meghalaya in India.

Geography
It has an average elevation of 1409 metres (4622 feet).e

Demographics
 India census, Nongstoin had a population of 22,003. Males constitute 50% of the population and females 50%. Nongstoin has an average literacy rate of 67%, higher than the national average of 59.5%: male literacy is 67%, and female literacy is 66%. In Nongstoin, 23% of the population is under 6 years of age.

Most of the people in the town overwhelmingly follow Christianity, with significant followers of Hinduism and a small Muslim population.

Culture
In January 2006, Pope Benedict XVI erected a diocese in Nongstoin, covering the West Khasi Hills district.
The Franciscan Missionary Brothers of the Catholic Church run a college and a school at Siejlieh, Nongstoin.

Since 2015 the annual Nongkhnum Festival was held at Nongkhnum River Island. The program conducts are right from pole climbing, trekking, beauty contest, to Moto-Cross and many more. Since the event is co-organised with Swachh Bharat it is meant to raose awareness about cleanliness. The event is supposed to be a plastic-free zone. Two people drowned at the river and one was injured at the moto cross event.

Place of Interest
 Nongkhnum River Island and Beach
 Weinia Falls
 Shadthum Falls
 Riatsohkhe Falls
 Langshiang Falls, Wei Spi Falls, Shad Chong Falls
 Mawthadraishan Peak and Lakes
 Pamphyrnai Lake
 Umyiap Paddy Field
 Rambrai, Urkhli, Mawlangsu.
 Punglieh, Syllei Iawkhein
 Wahriat Falls
 Nongstoin Bye Pass
 Kynroh
 Rwiang river, Wahblei river

References

 http://www.nongstoin.net

Geography of Meghalaya
West Khasi Hills district
Cities and towns in West Khasi Hills district